Cwmbran Stadium is a multi-purpose stadium and sports complex in Cwmbran, Wales. The stadium holds 10,500 people and the main outdoor arena consists of an athletics track surrounding a 4g football pitch. It is the home ground of Cwmbran Town F.C.

The complex has an outdoor floodlit artificial playing surface for football and hockey.

Indoor facilities include a 25-metre swimming pool and one of the best indoor bowling facilities in Wales with 6 rinks .

The most recent investment in the centre is a state of the art Fitness Suite which includes:

 45 station 'state-of-the-art' Fitness Suite
 Modern Health Suite including Sun Beds / Sauna / Jacuzzi / Steam Room
 Modern Dance/Group Exercise Studio
 8 & 4 Court Sports Halls
 1 Squash Court
 Beauty Therapy & Physiotherapy Treatment Rooms
 3 Community/Meeting Rooms
 Party & Crèche Facilities
 Café & Bar

The Grandstand was condemned in 2012.

The Track was condemned for competition purposes in 2013 but is still certified for training purposes.

References

External links
 Aerial Photo of Cwmbran Stadium
Cwmbran Stadium (Torfaen Council)

Football venues in Wales
Stadiums in Wales
Indoor arenas in Wales
Multi-purpose stadiums in the United Kingdom
Athletics (track and field) venues in Wales
Swimming venues in Wales
Cwmbran